The Church of Saint John of Ávila is a Roman Catholic parish church located in a modern neighbourhood of Alcalá de Henares, Spain.

The current temple was built in brickwork by Uruguayan engineer-architect Eladio Dieste; the dimensions of walls and roofs are very slim, thanks to reinforced ceramics. 

It is dedicated to saint John of Ávila. 

It is interesting to point out that, originally, this church was going to be built in Uruguay (Our Lady of Lourdes Church in Malvín); as the economic situation made this impossible, only the apse was built.

References

External links
 Parish website 

Buildings and structures in Alcalá de Henares

Churches in the Community of Madrid
Eladio Dieste buildings